Cezar or Cézar may refer to:

Arnaldo Cézar Coelho (born 1943), the first Brazilian to take charge of the FIFA World Cup final
Cezar (footballer, born 1986), Roberto Cezar Lima Acunha, Brazilian football midfielder
Cézar (footballer, born 1985), Cézar Augusto do Nascimento, Brazilian football striker
Cezar Bădiță (born 1979), international medley swimmer from Romania
Cezar Baltag (1937–1997), Romanian poet
Cezar Bolliac (1813–1881), Wallachian and Romanian radical political figure, amateur archaeologist, journalist and Romantic poet
Cezar Drăgăniṭă (born 1954), former Romanian handball player
Cezar Kurti, Albanian translator, known for his many contributions to Albanian literature
Cezar Lăzărescu (1923–1986), Romanian architect and urban planner
Cezar Mateus (born 1961), American lutenist, composer and luthier working in Princeton, New Jersey
Cezar Niculescu (born 1927), Romanian basketball player
Florin Cezar Ouatu (born 1980), Romanian opera countertenor and operatic pop singer
Cezar Papacostea (1886–1936), Romanian classicist
Cezar Petrescu (1892–1961), Romanian journalist, novelist and children's writer
Fabiano Cezar Viegas (born 1975), Brazilian central defender
Julio Cézar Ribeiro Vaughan (1845–1890), Brazilian writer and grammarian
Philip Cezar, former Philippine Basketball Association (PBA) basketball player

Romanian masculine given names